Marilyn Lanfear (December 27, 1930 - January 19, 2020) was an American sculptor and performance artist.

Life
Lanfear was born in Waco, Texas, and raised in Corpus Christi. She earned her bachelor's degree at the University of Texas and received an MFA from the University of Texas San Antonio in 1978. She married, raised a family, and lived in New York City for some years. After her return to Texas, she became a resident of San Antonio, where she showed much of her work.

Work
Her work has been shown in many venues in Texas, as well as some outside the United States. Her art is strongly autobiographical and sociological. Her work is also influenced by the theme of family. Her works are exhibited in the permanent collections of the San Antonio Museum of Art and the Crystal Bridges Museum of American Art.

References

1930 births
2020 deaths
American women sculptors
American women performance artists
American performance artists
20th-century American sculptors
20th-century American women artists
21st-century American sculptors
21st-century American women artists
University of Texas alumni
University of Texas at San Antonio alumni
Sculptors from Texas
People from Waco, Texas
People from San Antonio
People from Corpus Christi, Texas